Group B was one of two groups of the 2016 IIHF World Championship. The four best placed teams advanced to the playoff round, while the last placed team was relegated to Division I in 2017.

Standings

All times are local (UTC+3).

Matches

United States vs Canada

Finland vs Belarus

Slovakia vs Hungary

France vs Germany

Belarus vs United States

Hungary vs Canada

Finland vs Germany

France vs Slovakia

Belarus vs Canada

Finland vs United States

Slovakia vs Germany

Hungary vs France

Slovakia vs Belarus

Finland vs Hungary

United States vs France

Canada vs Germany

United States vs Hungary

Germany vs Belarus

France vs Finland

Hungary vs Belarus

Canada vs Slovakia

Germany vs United States

Slovakia vs Finland

Canada vs France

Germany vs Hungary

United States vs Slovakia

Belarus vs France

Canada vs Finland

References

External links
Official website

B